Virginia Highlands may refer to:
 Virginia-Highland, a neighborhood of Atlanta, Georgia ("Virginia Highlands" is a very common though incorrect variation of the name)
 the correct name of one of the original subdivisions of the Virginia-Highland neighborhood of Atlanta, Georgia
 the southwesternmost region of the US state of Virginia around Abingdon
Virginia Highlands Park in Arlington, Virginia